New Edition is the self titled second studio album released by American quintet New Edition on September 28, 1984 in North America. It was their first album on MCA Records.  It was also their first album without manager/producer Maurice Starr who would depart from the group during the making of the album after the group accused him of stealing their monetary earnings from their platinum debut. The album was produced by Vincent Brantley & Rick Timas, Grammy-nominated producer Michael Sembello & Richard Rudolph, Ray Parker Jr. and Peter Bunetta and Rick Chudacoff. The album reached #6 on the Billboard 200 and #1 on the Irish Albums Chart, and the R&B/Hip Hop Albums Chart (where it peaked for five weeks).

In the UK, the album was released on November 5, 1984.

Background 
Over a year after their first album, New Edition were a million-selling pop act by the time of this release.  They had also gone through a nasty court battle with their former mentor and producer Maurice Starr.  Around the time of the making of this album, the group and Starr argued over monetary earnings that the group felt that had been taken away by Starr, who has to this day steadfastly denied taking the boys' earnings from them.  The dispute came after the group members received their checks in their mailboxes only to discover that they were only given $1.87 despite the success of their debut album, Candy Girl and their accompanying US tour.  Angered, New Edition filed a lawsuit against Starr and demanded out of their contract.  Starr relented and gave the boys the freedom to leave.  The bitter split eventually led to Starr's creating "the white New Edition": New Kids on the Block. Meanwhile, the boys left Starr's label, the independent Streetwise Records in February 1984 and signed a new contract through Jump & Shoot Productions with MCA. Being given a bevy of producers including R&B mainstay Ray Parker Jr. and writer-producer Mike Sembello of "Maniac" fame among them, the group released their self-titled second album in the summer of 1984 to huge success.

Release and reaction
Thanks to more thorough promotion and music tailored for more of a mainstream audience, New Edition won new fans upon the release of this album.  The first two singles: "Cool It Now" and "Mr. Telephone Man" both became top twenty pop hits and reached number one on the R&B singles chart. The album peaked at number six on the Billboard pop albums chart and number one on the R&B albums chart. It later spawned the top forty pop hit with the ballad "Lost in Love" and the uptempo top forty R&B single, "My Secret (Didja Gitit Yet?)". The album was certified double-platinum. This album was also promoted under a more clean-cut pop image for the group, much different from the streetwise persona they had during their first album, a marketing decision that various group members would later admit that they weren't thrilled about at the time.

Track listing

Personnel
New Edition
Ronnie DeVoe - background vocals; rap
Bobby Brown - lead and background vocals, rap
Ricky Bell - lead and background vocals, rap
Michael Bivins - background vocals; rap
Ralph Tresvant - lead, background vocals, and rap
Additional musicians
 Vincent Brantley - keyboards
 Rick Timas - bass, guitar, drums
 Ray Parker Jr. - bass, guitar, drums, synthesizer
 Jack Ashford - tambourine
 Sylvester Rivers - electric piano
 Sonny Burke - piano
 Michael Sembello - LinnDrum, guitar
 Danny Sembello - bass, Fender Rhodes, drum programming
 Carlos Vega - Simmons drums
 Bobby Caldwell - guitar
 Randy Waldman - synthesizers, keyboards
 Richard James Burgess - programming
 Don Freeman - keyboards
 Bill Elliott - synthesizers, keyboards
 Brian Ray - guitar
 Charles Fearing - guitar
 Rick Chudacoff - bass, keyboards
 Peter Bunetta - drums, percussion
 Joe Lala - percussion
 Jerry Peterson - saxophone
 Arno Lucas - percussion
 Brad Buxer - synthesizers

Charts

Certifications

References 

1984 albums
New Edition albums
Albums produced by Richard James Burgess
MCA Records albums